The Aïr and Ténéré National Nature Reserve is a national nature reserve in Niger. It includes several overlapping reserve designations, and is designated a UNESCO World Heritage Site. It covers both the eastern half of the Aïr Mountains and the western sections of the Ténéré desert.  It has been identified by BirdLife International as an Important Bird Area.

The Aïr and Ténéré Natural Reserves UNESCO World Heritage Site was established in 1991, and designated as a site in danger in 1992. It was designated under criteria vii, ix, x, and is designated #573.

UNESCO's Aïr and Ténéré Natural Reserves include two parts:
Aïr and Ténéré National Nature Reserve
 IUCN type IV
Established 1 January 1988
64,560 km²
Aïr and Ténéré Addax Sanctuary
Strict Nature Reserve IUCN type Ia
Established 1 January 1988
12,800 km²

References

Jennifer Talbot. The Tuareg People and the Air Tenere Conservation and Development Project, Niger, West Africa. POPULATION-ENVIRONMENT DYNAMICS:TRANSITIONS AND SUSTAINABILITY, University of Michigan, 1998.

External links

UNESCO World Heritage Site profile.
UNEP-WCMC World Heritage Site datasheet

National parks of Niger
Protected areas established in 1988
Important Bird Areas of Niger
World Heritage Sites in Niger